Haakon Pedersen (9 October 1906 – 7 September 1991) was a Norwegian speed skater who competed in the 1928 Winter Olympics and in the 1932 Winter Olympics.

In 1928 he finished fifth in the 500 metres competition.

Four years later he competed in the 500 metres event again but was eliminated in the heats.

External links
 Speed skating 1928 

1906 births
1991 deaths
Norwegian male speed skaters
Olympic speed skaters of Norway
Speed skaters at the 1928 Winter Olympics
Speed skaters at the 1932 Winter Olympics